San Pablo is a census-designated place in Doña Ana County, New Mexico, United States. Its population was 806 as of the 2010 census. The community is located south of Las Cruces along New Mexico State Road 28.

Geography

Demographics

Education
It is located in Las Cruces Public Schools.

References

Census-designated places in New Mexico
Census-designated places in Doña Ana County, New Mexico